Matthew Silva (born March 28, 1991) is a Canadian professional soccer player who plays as a goalkeeper for Gibraltar National League club Bruno's Magpies.

College career
Silva spent four years playing college soccer at Le Moyne College, where he was the starting keeper for the Dolphins. In his first season, he was named Northeast-10 Conference rookie of the year and would go on to earn conference all-star honours three times.

Club career

Semi-pro career
In 2010, Silva played in the USL Premier Development League with the Toronto Lynx, making seven appearances that season.

In 2011, he played in the Canadian Soccer League with SC Toronto, before returning to the Lynx in 2012, where he made five appearances that season and seven the following season.

In 2014, Silva played for North York Astros in the Canadian Soccer League.

Philippines
Silva signed his first professional contract with Kaya of the United Football League on January 21, 2015. That season, Kaya captured the UFL Cup, defeating Ceres in the final.

Sweden
In February 2016, Silva joined Swedish Division 2 club Bodens BK.

In January 2018, Silva signed for Swedish Division 2 club Österlen FF. After the season, he trialed with Trelleborgs FF,Mjällby AIF and Mjällby AIF.

Canada
Silva returned to Canada and signed for Canadian Premier League club York9 on February 1, 2019. He made his debut for the club on July 17 against Pacific FC. York9 secured a 2-1 victory. Though expected to be the starting goalkeeper when he signed, Silva spent most of the 2019 season backing up first choice goalkeeper Nathan Ingham, and his debut against Pacific turned out to be his only game of the season. On November 15, 2019, the club announced that Silva would not be returning for the 2020 season.

On June 16, 2020, Valour FC announced they had signed Silva to a deal. He did not make an appearance in the shortened 2020 season, but was still re-signed for 2021. In 2021 he finally got to see the pitch for Valour, but was still the firm second choice goalkeeper behind Jonathan Sirois. Still, Silva wanted and believed he was capable of being a starting goalkeeper. However, all clubs in the CPL already had a set first choice keeper, so he decided he would have to leave Canada. In January 2022, Valour declined Silva's contract option for 2022.

Return to Philippines
In 2022, he joined Philippines Football League club United City. With United City he featured in the AFC Champions League, where he made one of the top five saves of the group stage. However, his team was a heavy underdog and was eliminated in the group stage. Despite this, he also experienced success with United City, featuring twice in the club's cup run that saw them win the Copa Paulino Alcantara for the first time in club history. Although happy with the trophy win, Silva would move on from the Philippines shortly after.

Gibraltar 
Shortly after departing United City, he signed with Gibraltarian side Bruno's Magpies, who were competing in the 2022-23 Europa Conference League. He participated in the European tournament and played in both matches against Crusaders F.C.

Honours 
Kaya
 UFL Cup: 2015

United City 
 Copa Paulino Alcantara: 2022

Individual
 Northeast-10 Rookie of the Year: 2010

References

External links

1991 births
Living people
Association football goalkeepers
Canadian soccer players
Soccer players from Mississauga
Canadian expatriate soccer players
Expatriate soccer players in the United States
Canadian expatriate sportspeople in the United States
Expatriate footballers in the Philippines
Canadian expatriate sportspeople in the Philippines
Expatriate footballers in Sweden
Canadian expatriate sportspeople in Sweden
Le Moyne Dolphins men's soccer players
Toronto Lynx players
SC Toronto players
North York Astros players
Kaya F.C. players
Bodens BK players
York United FC players
Valour FC players
USL League Two players
F.C. Bruno's Magpies players
Canadian Soccer League (1998–present) players
Division 2 (Swedish football) players
Canadian Premier League players